_wE, Invaders is the second release, and first EP by Canadian avant-garde extreme metal band uneXpect.

Track listing
"Novaë" – 6:52
"Rooted Shadows" – 6:08
"In Velvet Coffins We Slept" (re-recording) – 8:22
"Chromatic Chimera" – 5:14

Personnel
 – Vocals, guitars
Artagoth – Vocals, guitars
Le bateleur – Violins
Leïlindel – Vocals
ExoD – Keyboards, synthesizers, sampling
ChaotH – 7 and 9 string bass
Dasnos – Drums on "Rooted Shadows" and "In Velvet Coffins We Slept"
Anthony Trujillo – Drums on "Novaë"

Guest musicians
Nathalie Duchesne – additional violin and cello
Stéphanie Colerette – additional violin and cello

References

Unexpect albums
2003 EPs
Articles with underscores in the title